Busto Arsizio is an Italian city and comune in the south-easternmost part of the Province of Varese, in the region of Lombardy, in Northern Italy,  north of Milan. The economy of Busto Arsizio is mainly based on industry and commerce. It is the fifth municipality in the region by population and the first in the province.

History
Despite some claims about a Celtic heritage, recent studies suggest that the "Bustocchis ancestors were Ligurians, called "wild" by Pliny, "marauders and robbers" by Livy and "unshaven and hairy" by Pompeius Tragus. They were skilled ironworkers and much sought after as mercenary soldiers. A remote Ligurian influence is perceptible in the local dialect, Büstócu, slightly different from other Western Lombard varieties, according to a local expert and historian Luigi Giavini.

Traditionally these first inhabitants used to set fire to woods made of old and young oaks and black hornbeams, which at that time, covered the whole Padan Plain. This slash-and-burn practice, known as "debbio" in Italian, aimed to create fields where grapevines or cereals such as foxtail, millet and rye were grown, or just to create open spaces where stone huts with thatched roofs were built. By doing this, they created a bustum (burnt, in Latin), that is a new settlement which, in order to be distinguished from the other nearby settlements, was assigned a name: arsicium (again "burnt", or better "arid") for Busto Arsizio, whose name is actually a tautology; carulfì for nearby Busto Garolfo, cava for Busto Cava, later Buscate.

The slow increase in population was helped by the Insubres, a Gaulish tribe who arrived in successive waves by crossing the Alps c. 500 BCE. It is said that they defeated the Etruscans, who by then controlled the area, leaving some geographical names behind (Arno creek (not to be confused with Florence's river), Castronno, Caronno, Biandronno, etc.).

Busto Arsizio was created on the route between Milan and Lake Maggiore (called "Milan’s road", an alternative route to the existent Sempione), part of which, before the creation of the Naviglio Grande, made use of the navigational water of the Ticino river.

However, nothing is clearly known about Busto Arsizio's history before the 10th century, when the city's name was first discovered in documents, already with its present name: loco Busti qui dicitur Arsizio. A part of the powerful Contado of the Seprio, in 1176, its citizens likely participated (on both sides) in the famous Battle of Legnano, actually fought between Busto Arsizio's frazione of Borsano and nearby Villa Cortese, when Frederick Barbarossa was defeated by the communal militia of the Lombard League. From the 13th century, the city became renowned for its production of textiles. Even its feudalization in later centuries under several lords, vassals of the masters of Milan, did not stop its slow but constant growth; nor did the plague, which hit hard in 1630, traditionally being stopped by the Virgin Mary after the Bustocchi, always a pious Catholic flock, prayed for respite from the deadly epidemic.

By the mid-19th century, modern industry began to take over strongly; in a few decades, Busto Arsizio became the so-called "Manchester of Italy". In 1864, while the "Bustocco" Eugenio Tosi was the Archbishop of Milan, it was granted privileges by king Victor Emmanuel II of Italy. The Busto Arsizio continued to grow over the next century, absorbing the nearby communities of Borsano and Sacconago in 1927 in a major administrative reform implemented by the Fascist regime and was only marginally damaged even by World War II (a single Allied airdropped bomb is said to have hit the train station). This respite was given, actually, by the fact that the city hosted the important Allied liaison mission with the partisans, the Chrysler mission, led by Lt. Aldo Icardi, later famous for his involvement in the Holohan Murder Case. During the conflict, Busto Arsizio was a major industrial centre for war production, and the occupying Germans moved the Italian national radio there. The Italian resistance movement resorted preferably to strikes and sabotage than to overt guerrilla warfare, since those willing to fight mostly took to the Ossola mountains, but strengthened in time, suffering grievous losses to arrests, tortures and deportation to the Nazi lager system. The names of Mauthausen-Gusen and Flossenbürg concentration and extermination camps are sadly known to the Bustocchi, as dozens of their fellow citizens died there. On 25 April 1945, when the partisans took over, Busto Arsizio gave voice to the first free radio channel in northern Italy since the advent of Fascism.

After the war, Busto Arsizio turned increasingly on the right of the political spectrum as its bigger industries in the 1960s and 1970s decayed, to be replaced by many familiar small enterprises and a new service-based economy. Today, the city represents a major stronghold for both Forza Italia and Lega Nord right-wing political parties.

Busto Arsizio's districts

There are 9 districts in Busto Arsizio, these are: Sant'Anna, San Michele, San Giovanni, Sant'Edoardo, Madonna Regina, Beata Giuliana, Santi Apostoli, Borsano and Sacconago.

Demographics

Main sights
The most important buildings of the city are the churches. There are several built in the last millennium, many of which are reconstructions of former churches.

The shrine of Santa Maria di Piazza
The most remarkable building of the Renaissance period – indeed the only remaining – is the shrine of Santa Maria di Piazza ("Saint Mary of the Square"), also called shrine of the Beata Vergine dell'Aiuto ("Blessed Virgin of the Help"). The building stands in the city centre. It was built between 1515 and 1522. The village of Crespi d'Adda, built up for Cristoforo Benigno Crespi, is home to a smaller version of the shrine.

The church of Saint John the Baptist

The church of Saint John the Baptist, in the city centre, was built between 1609 and 1635 by Francesco Maria Ricchini, but the bell tower is older (between 1400 and 1418). The façade, finished in 1701 by Domenico Valmagini, has many statues and decorations. In the interior are numerous paintings by Daniele Crespi, a celebrated painter born at Busto Arsizio, such as Cristo morto con San Domenico and Biagio Bellotti. The square in front of this church was built over the ancient cemetery.

The church of Saint Michael the Archangel

The third biggest church in the city is the Church of Saint Michael Archangel. Its bell tower, built in the 10th century, is the oldest building in Busto Arsizio; originally it was part of a Lombard fortification. The present church was built by the architect Francesco Maria Richini. In the church there are some relics, the most important of which is the body of San Felice Martire.

The church of Saint Roch
Built after the 1485 bubonic plague and dedicated to Saint Roch, invoked against the plague, it was rebuilt from 1706 to 1713 thanks to donations by the lawyer Carlo Visconti. Inside the church, there are frescos by Salvatore and Francesco Maria Bianchi (1731) and Biagio Bellotti.

Museum of Textiles and Industry
The Museum of Textiles and Industry was officially inaugurated in 1997 after years of restoration, and its collections are representative of Busto's economical history. They explain how the city developed from a small agricultural village to a thriving, industrial centre of manufacturing and commerce in a few decades.

Traditional festivals

The patron saints of the city are Saint John the Baptist and Saint Michael the Archangel, whose feasts are traditionally celebrated on 24 June and 29 September.

In recent times the city council has given also civic relevance to celebrations that up to now were almost completely of a religious kind. In winter, the burning of the Giöbia (historical spelling: Gioeubia) a (usually) female puppet, symbolizing the "chasing" out of winter and its troubles, and on a more sinister note, the change from a matriarchal to a patriarchal society in ancient times, is an established tradition since time immemorial. In the past each family prepared its simple puppet to be burnt, and then its ashes were dispersed to fertilize the fields as a good omen. Now the celebration is more organized and publicly supported but still heartily felt by the populace.

Busto Arsizio has two carnival masks, called Tarlisu and Bumbasina from the name of typical textiles.

Music
Mina, an Italian pop star, was born in Busto Arsizio. Italian violinist and conductor Uto Ughi was also born and is currently living in the city.

Sport

Busto Arsizio is the host for the Federazione Italiana Sport Croquet, the lawns being located at the Cascina del Lupo Sporting Centre just outside the city.

Pro Patria Calcio football club plays in Busto Arsizio at the Carlo Speroni Stadium.

The football team has qualified for access to the Serie B National Championship many times, but the team has not been part of the division since 1965–1966.

Pro Patria A.R.C. Busto Arsizio is the athletic society.

Yamamay Busto Arsizio is the main volleyball society of the city and plays in the first national division.

One of the most important athletes of Busto Arsizio is Umberto Pelizzari, born on August 28, 1965, widely considered among the best freedivers of all time. Other important athletes are the former twirling world champion Chiara Stefanazzi and the former footballers Carlo Reguzzoni, Antonio Azimonti, Aldo Marelli, Egidio Calloni, Natale Masera and Michele Ferri.

Busto Arsizio is also the city where the Italian volleyball player Caterina Bosetti is born.

Transport
Busto Arsizio is served by two railway stations: Busto Arsizio railway station, managed by Rete Ferroviaria Italiana, and Busto Arsizio Nord railway station, managed by Ferrovienord.

Initially, the Busto Arsizio area was selected for one specific reason: ease of transport – the city is located exactly in the middle between Varese and Milan. Travel from Busto Arsizio to either city is approximately 30 minutes.

Economy 
Busto Arsizio's economic model has changed over the years: at the beginning, the most developed sectors were the primary and secondary sectors, but in the last decades also the tertiary sector has grown. According to Fitch, in 2009 GDP was 20% higher than the European average, while unemployment was at 4%.

Agricolture

The terrain of Busto Arsizio has never been particularly favourable for agriculture, for this reason from the very beginning the inhabitants of the city added to it other activities, such as leather tanning. Despite this, the primary sector remained the predominant one until the 16th century. The most important crop was that of cereals.Silkworm breeding was also practised for a long time.

Craftsmanship

In the 16th century, Busto Arsizio was known for the production of moleskin. Pewter processing is also widespread in the city, aimed at the production of trophies, trays and plates.

Industry

Busto Arsizio has been one of the major textile centres of Italy for many years and well known abroad. The city birthed a new class of entrepreneurs who started the first textile factors. Also, a new role in society was created: the worker-peasant, who found employment in these factories without completely neglecting agricultural activities. The city began to be called 'the Manchester of Italy' or 'the city of 100 chimneys'.

Services

In 1873 Eugenio Cantoni, Pasquale Pozzi and other entrepreneurs linked to the cotton industry founded the Banca of Busto Arsizio, which was transformed in 1911 into the Italian Provincial Credit Society, a forerunner of Italian Discount Bank, one of the main Italian credit institutions in the years of the First World War.

Neighbouring cities 
Among the surrounding municipalities to Busto Arsizio are: Marnate, Castellanza, Olgiate Olona, Gorla Maggiore, Gorla Minore, Solbiate Olona, Fagnano Olona.

International relations

Twin towns—Sister cities
Busto Arsizio is twinned with:
 Domodossola, Italy
 Épinay-sur-Seine, France
 Nacfa, Eritrea
 Cixi, China

Notable people
Mario Caccia, footballer
Massimiliano Gioni, curator

See also
La Famiglia Bustocca

References

External links

 Busto Arsizio official website

 
Cities and towns in Lombardy